This is the list of the 100 best-selling certified singles in Finland, according to Musiikkituottajat – IFPI Finland.

See also
List of best-selling singles
Milestones on the Official Finnish Singles Chart
List of best-selling albums in Finland
List of best-selling music artists in Finland

References

Finnish music
Finland